This is a list of episodes for the television series Father Dowling Mysteries.

Series overview
All three seasons and the TV-movie have been released on DVD by Paramount Home Video.

TV-movie (1987)

Episodes

Season 1 (1989)

Season 2 (1990)

Season 3 (1990–91)

References

External links
 

Lists of American crime television series episodes